The Sprinter (also called Peters Plus Sprinter or PPS ) is a microcomputer made by the Russian firm Peters Plus, Ltd. It was the last ZX Spectrum clone produced in a factory.  

It was built using what the company called a "Flex architecture", using an Altera PLD as part of the core logic. This allows the machine's hardware to be reconfigured on the fly  for different ZX-Spectrum models compatibility or its own enhanced native mode (set by default on boot and running the Estex operating system). This design is comparable to the design of Jeri Ellsworth's C-One reprogrammable computer.

Specifications
The computer is built on a standard computer tower configuration, using standard floppy discs, CD-ROM and hard disk drives.

CPU: Z84C15 at 21 MHz or 3.5 MHz, Altera PLD
Video output: SECAM TV or CGA monitor
Graphic modes: 320 x 256 with 256 colors, 640 x 256 with 16 colors, text mode 80 x 32 with 16 colors, 16 million color palette, 256/512 Kb video RAM
Sound: Beeper, AY-3-8910, 16-bit DAC
IDE & FDD onboard controllers
Two ISA-8 slots

References

External links
 Ivan Mak's website 
 Sprinter unofficial site

Home computer remakes
ZX Spectrum clones
Microcomputers